James Lemke may refer to:
 James Lemke (tennis) (born 1988), Australian tennis player
 James U. Lemke (1929–2019), American physicist and entrepreneur